The 1925 Sam Houston State Bearkats football team represented Sam Houston State Teachers College (now known as Sam Houston State University) as a member of the Texas Intercollegiate Athletic Association (TIAA) during the 1925 college football season. Led by third-year head coach J. W. Jones, the Bearkats compiled an overall record of 5–4 with a mark of 1–2 in conference play, and finished in eighth place in the TIAA.

Schedule

References

Sam Houston State
Sam Houston Bearkats football seasons
Sam Houston State Bearkats football